Soturnia is an extinct genus of procolophonid parareptile. It is known from rocks of the Late Triassic-age Caturrita Formation of the municipality of Faxinal do Soturno in the geopark of Paleorrota, Brazil. Soturnia was named in 2003 by Cisneros and Schultz; the type species is S. caliodon. It was a leptopleuroninae procolophonid.

References

External links 

 Soturnia in the Paleobiology Database

Leptopleuronines
Triassic parareptiles
Late Triassic reptiles of South America
Triassic Brazil
Fossils of Brazil
Paraná Basin
Fossil taxa described in 2003
Prehistoric reptile genera